Come Blow Your Horn is an album recorded by Canadian jazz trumpeter Maynard Ferguson in 1963 which was originally released on the Cameo label.

Reception 

AllMusic reviewer Matt Collar stated "Featuring arrangements by Don Sebesky, the albums showcased Ferguson's swinging and powerful high-note-centric style backed by his always dynamic ensemble".

Track listing 
 "Groove" (Oliver Nelson) – 2:48
 "Country Boy" (Bill Holman) – 3:52
 "Blues for a Four String Guitar" (Elmer Bernstein) – 2:25
 "Whisper Not" (Benny Golson, Leonard Feather) – 6:24
 "We've Got a World That Swings" (Lil Mattis, Lois Yule Brown) – 2:18
 "Chicago That Toddling Town" (Fred Fisher) – 6:03
 "Naked City Theme" (Billy May) – 2:27
 "New Hope" (Don Raider) – 2:41
 "Antony and Cleopatra Theme" (Alex North) – 2:30
 "Come Blow Your Horn" (Jimmy van Heusen, Sammy Cahn) – 2:35	
Recorded at Fine Recording Studios in Queens, New York on August 29, 1963 (tracks 2, 3 & 5) and September 4, 1963 (tracks 1, 4, 6, 8 & 10) and unknown date (tracks 7 & 9)

Personnel 
Maynard Ferguson – trumpet, valve trombone, French horn
Dusan Goykovitch, Nat Pavone, Rick Kiefer – trumpet
Don Doane, Kenny Rupp – trombone
Lanny Morgan – alto saxophone
Willie Maiden, Frank Vicari – tenor saxophone
Ronnie Cuber – baritone saxophone
Mike Abene – piano
Linc Milliman – bass
Rufus Jones – drums
Mike Abene (track 4 & 6), Al Cohn (track 10), Bill Holman (track 2), Willie Maiden (track 5), Don Raider (track 8), Don Sebesky (tracks 7 & 9) – arrangers

References 

1963 albums
Maynard Ferguson albums
Cameo-Parkway Records albums
Albums arranged by Don Sebesky
Albums arranged by Al Cohn